Kolovatovka is a rural locality (a village) in Olshanskoye Rural Settlement, Ostrogozhsky District, Voronezh Oblast, Russia. The population was 78 as of 2010.

Geography 
Kolovatovka is located 21 km southwest of Ostrogozhsk (the district's administrative centre) by road. Nizhny Olshan is the nearest rural locality.

References 

Rural localities in Ostrogozhsky District